The 2013–14 UMBC Retrievers men's basketball team  represented the University of Maryland, Baltimore County during the 2013–14 NCAA Division I men's basketball season. The Retrievers, led by second-year head coach Aki Thomas, played their home games at the Retriever Activities Center and were members of the America East Conference. They finished the season 9–21, 5–11 in American East play to finish in sixth place. They lost in the quarterfinals of the American East tournament to Albany.

Roster

Schedule

|-
!colspan=9 style="background:#000000; color:#ffb210;"| Regular season

 

|-
!colspan=9 style="background:#000000; color:#ffb210;"| 2014 America East tournament

References

UMBC
UMBC Retrievers men's basketball seasons
UMBC
UMBC